The Slovak Rally Championship is a rallying series based in the Slovakia. The first championship was run in 1994.

Slovak Rally Championship

Champions

Multiple wins by individual

Multiple wins by car manufacturer

References

External links
Website of rallye.sk

Motorsport competitions in Slovakia
Rally racing series
Recurring sporting events established in 1994
1994 establishments in Slovakia